Xu Jian (born July 27, 1970) is a Chinese softball player. She competed in the 1996 Summer Olympics and in the 2000 Summer Olympics.

In 1996, she won the silver medal as part of the Chinese team. She played eight matches. In the 2000 Olympic softball competition she finished fourth with the Chinese team. She played five matches.

References

Profile

1970 births
Living people
Chinese softball players
Softball players at the 1996 Summer Olympics
Softball players at the 2000 Summer Olympics
Olympic silver medalists for China
Olympic softball players of China
Olympic medalists in softball
Asian Games medalists in softball
Softball players at the 1998 Asian Games
Medalists at the 1998 Asian Games
Asian Games gold medalists for China
Medalists at the 1996 Summer Olympics